Cultural Centre busway station is located in Brisbane, Australia serving the South Bank precinct. It is located directly south of Victoria Bridge and close to South Brisbane railway station.

The station takes its name from its location within the Queensland Cultural Centre precinct. The platforms are accessible from the pedestrian bridge linking the Queensland Performing Arts Centre to the Queensland Museum and Queensland Art Gallery. The station is also close to the Brisbane Convention & Exhibition Centre, Queensland Conservatorium Griffith University, South Bank Piazza and the western end of the South Bank Parklands.

History
Cultural Centre busway station opened on 23 October 2000 when the South East Busway opened to Woolloongabba. When built, it only had one lane in each direction with no ability for buses to pass. In March 2003 work commenced to alleviate this with the platforms set back to allow for a passing lane in each direction. Some materials from the original station were reused in the construction of Capalaba bus station. The work was completed in October 2004.

Services
The station services buses to the southern suburbs and South East Busway as well as providing an alternative terminus to the Brisbane central business district for many bus services from northern suburbs including those operating via the Northern Busway. Many CityXpress and most BUZ routes pass through the station, providing convenient transfer to and from major servicing areas outside the city. It is served by 70 routes operated by Clarks Logan City Bus Service and Transport for Brisbane as part of the Translink network.

Northern Busway services
No Northern Busway services directly connect King George Square busway station with the Queen Street bus station. After stopping at Cultural Centre station, a number of outbound (northbound) services bypass the Queen Street bus station and stop at the King George Square on the northern side of the Brisbane River and vice versa.

Platforms
Services depart as follows:

Platform 1

Platform 2

Facilities
A pedestrian bridge towards the south of the station, which provide access to the platforms, connects the Queensland Performing Arts Centre with both the Queensland Museum and the Queensland Art Gallery. The elevated pedestrian bridge has three lifts.

There is a giant-size model of a cicada right outside Platform 2 of the station.

Notes

References

External links

Bus stations in Brisbane
South Brisbane, Queensland
Transport infrastructure completed in 2000
2000 establishments in Australia